Michael Warren (born 1950 in Gorey, County Wexford, Ireland) is an Irish sculptor who produces site-specific public art.

Inspired by Oisín Kelly, his art teacher at St Columba's College, Michael Warren studied at Bath Academy of Art, at Trinity College Dublin and, from 1971 to 1975, at the Accademia di Brera in Milan. He now lives and works in Co. Wexford.

He has a number of very visible works in Ireland, including the large sweeping wood sculpture in front of the Dublin Civic Offices. Wood Quay, where the civic offices stand, was the centre of Viking Dublin and the sculpture evokes the form, and the powerful grace, of a Viking ship. It also reflects vertically the horizontal sweep of the nearby Liffey as it enters its bay. A complex balance of meanings matching a delicate, though massive, balance of substance is typical of his work.  Warren himself describes the useful ambiguity of abstraction (Hill 1998)

With Roland Tallon he created Tulach a' tSolais (Mound of Light), a memorial to the 1798 rebellion at Oulart Hill, County Wexford. Here, a room was hollowed out of a small hill; the room contains two abstract curved oak forms and is illuminated by natural light falling through a long slot in its ceiling and walls. Despite the unusual and abstract constitution of this memorial and despite the fraught political resonance of the rebellion, Tulach a' tSolais is popular and something of a local attraction. His Gateway in Dún Laoghaire was less popular with some local people and it was eventually removed and returned to the artist.

At the northern entrance to the village of Leighlinbridge, County Carlow, is a sculpture by Michael Warren, depicting the thrones of the ancient seat of the Kings of South Leinster at Dinn Righ (The hill of the Kings). The Kings of Leinster lived near the village.

Work on display
 Cloch na gCoillte (2013) Clonakilty, County Cork, Ireland
 Unbroken Line (2013) Dublin Castle, Dublin, Ireland
 Antaeus II (2010) Scott Cottage, Rossdohan, County Kerry, Ireland
 Janus (2010) Western Gate Building, University College Cork, Cork, Ireland
 M-7 23, homage to Eileen Gray II (2010) Department of Environment, Wexford, Ireland
 Stele for Thomas Wyse (2009) Waterford Institute of Technology, Waterford, Ireland
 Obelisk (2009) Battle of the Boyne Visitor Centre, Oldbridge Estate, County Meath, Ireland
 Lieu de Rencontre (2008) Dar Sabre, Marrakech, Morocco
 M-7 23 (2008) Expo 2008, Zaragoza, Spain
 Wave Form (2008) No1 Warrington Place, Dublin, Ireland
 Reliquery (2007) St Dominic's College, Cabra, Dublin, Ireland
 Go deo, homage to Samuel Beckett, Trinity College Dublin, Ireland
 Em Louvor dos Limites (2005) Carrazeda de Ansiães, Portugal
 No Pasaran (2004) the Mall, Waterford, Ireland
 Amor Fati (2003) Jiaobanshan Park, Taoyuan, Taiwan
 Bronze Arch (2003) Gongju, Korea
 Her Hair (II) (2003) Courtown Harbour, County Wexford, Ireland
 Gateway (2002) Dún Laoghaire, County Dublin, Ireland
 East Point (2001) East Point, Dublin, Ireland
 Pasqua (III) (2001) University of Valencia, Spain
 Ceatharloch (2001) Carlow, Ireland
 Millennium Sculpture (2001) Radió Telefís Éireann, Dublin, Ireland
 Dolmen (2000) Irish Management Institute, Dublin, Ireland
 Almanac (2000) Royal Victoria Hospital, Belfast, Northern Ireland
 Tulach a’ tSolais (1999) Oulart Hill, County Wexford, Ireland
 Atlanticus (1999) County Buildings, Galway, Ireland
 Pasqua (II) (1999) A&L Goodbody HQ, International Financial Services Centre, Dublin, Ireland
 El Arado y las Estrellas (1998) Metropolitan Park, Quito, Ecuador
 Antaeus (1998), Devil's Glen, County Wicklow, Ireland
 Chi (III) (1998) Rathdown School, Dún Laoghaire, County Dublin, Ireland
 Her Hair (1997) East Point, Dublin, Ireland
 Hors les murs (1996) Clermont-Ferrand, France
 Trade Winds (1996) Santo Tirso, Portugal
 Ophelia (1st version) (1995) Dieudonné, Oise, France
 Ophelia (2nd version) (1995) Castlelough, County Clare, Ireland
 Alizes et tortues (1994) Lamentin, Guadeloupe, French West Indies
 Wood Quay (1994) Civic Offices, Dublin, Ireland
 Eena-Meena-Mina-Mo (1993) Farnsworth House, Plano, Illinois, USA
 Salmon Fall (1993) University of Limerick, Limerick, Ireland
 Living Relic (1993) Dunleer, County Louth, Ireland
 A Full Moon in March (1992) Minamikata, Japan
 Elegy to Light (1992) island of Thassos, Greece
 Pagan Place (1991) Encamp, Principality of Andorra
 Chi (1991) Allied Dunbar, Swindon, England
 Throughway (1991) University College Dublin, Ireland
 Beneath the ’bow (1991) Irish Museum of Modern Art, Dublin, Ireland
 Chi (1990) Oloron Sainte-Marie, France
 Journey Inland (1990) Campo de las Naciones, Madrid, Spain
 Thrones (1989) Hakone Open Air Museum, Japan
 Bio-dynamics (1989) Conrad Hotel, Dublin, Ireland
 Antigone (1988) Olympic Sculpture Park, Seoul, Korea
 De-creation (VI) (1987) Ferrybank, Wexford, Ireland
 Timber Construction for Plano (1986) Farnsworth House, Plano, Illinois, USA
 After Image (1986) Castletown Cox, County Kilkenny, Ireland
 Thrones (1986) Leighlinbridge, County Carlow, Ireland
 Countermovement (1985) Trinity College Dublin, Ireland
 Void Anchored (1985) Kilkenny Castle, Kilkenny, Ireland
 Escultura Blanca (1985) Jeddah, Saudi Arabia
 Articulation of Void (1985) Jeddah, Saudi Arabia
 Broken Obelisk (1985) Foxrock, County Dublin, Ireland
 Chi (I) (1984) Ulster Museum, Belfast, Northern Ireland
 Family (1983) Gilbey's of Ireland, Dublin, Ireland
 Noche Oscura (1981) Dublin Port & Docks Board, Dublin, Ireland
 De-creation (V) (1978) Radió Telefís Éireann, Dublin, Ireland

References

Further reading
 Suzanne McNab (2002) Warren, Michael in Brian Lalor (Ed.), The Encyclopedia of Ireland. Dublin: Gill and Macmillan. 
 Judith Hill (1998) Irish public sculpture. Dublin: Four Courts Press. 
 Rod Mengham and others (2010) Michael Warren: Unbroken Line. Carlow: Visual Centre for Contemporary Art & The George Bernard Shaw Theatre.

External links

 Artist's homepage
 Biographical note on the RTÉ website
 Aosdána biographical note
 Full-length interview

1950 births
Living people
People from Gorey
Aosdána members
Irish sculptors